Albert Ivanovich Rachkov (22 June 1927 – 5 January 2023) was a Soviet-Russian diplomat and politician. He served as the second secretary of the Communist Party of Turkmenistan from 1980 to 1986.

Rachkov died in Moscow on 5 January 2023, at the age of 95.

References

1927 births
2023 deaths
Soviet diplomats
Ambassadors of the Soviet Union to South Yemen
Central Committee of the Communist Party of the Soviet Union candidate members
Eleventh convocation members of the Soviet of the Union
Communist Party of Turkmenistan politicians
Recipients of the Order of the Red Banner of Labour
People from Stavropol